HeliOperations is a British helicopter company based on the Isle of Portland, Dorset, England, at the old Naval Air Station of RNAS Portland providing training and services.  HeliOperations is the last operator of Westland WS-61 Sea King helicopters in the United Kingdom., providing training to the Marineflieger

Fleet
 2 x Westland Sea King  (Airframe numbers ZA166 and XV666)

Notes

References

Helicopter operators